Puja or Pooja may refer to:

Religion
Puja (Hinduism), a ritual to host, honor or of devotional worship, or one to celebrate an event
Puja (Buddhism), expressions of honour, worship and devotional attention
 Puja, a wooden stick, sometimes leather-covered, used to play a singing bowl

People
Pooja Banerjee (born 1991), Indian television actress
Pooja Bhatt (born 1972), Bollywood producer, director and actress
 Pooja Bose, Indian television actress
Pooja Gandhi, Indian film actress 
Pooja Hegde, Indian actress
Pooja Pal (alternate spelling Puja Pal), Indian politician from the Bahujan Samaj Party
Pooja Singh, Indian television actress
Pooja Umashankar, Indian actress
Puja Gupta, winner of Miss India Universe in 2007
Frigyes Puja (1921–2008), native form Puja Frigyes, Hungarian politician
Miss Pooja, (born 1980) (real name Gurinder Kaur Kainth), Indian singer

Other uses
Puja, Nepal, a town in the Rapti Zone of central south-western Nepal
Pooja Naberrie, a fictional character in the Star Wars universe
Pooja (1940 film), a 1940 Hindi/Urdu psychological drama film
Pooja (1967 film), a 1967 Indian Malayalam film
Pooja (1975 film), a 1975 Telugu Romantic musical film
Pooja, a 2010 film directed by Deepak Rauniyar

Indian feminine given names